Marcus Weathers (born August 5, 1997) is an American basketball player who last played for the Tainan TSG GhostHawks of the T1 League. He played college basketball for the Miami RedHawks, Duquesne University for about three seasons, and spent his last year of eligibility at SMU Mustangs.

Collegiate career

SMU Mustangs (2021–2022)
As Marcus and his twin brother, Michael, were reunited for almost quite some time, they both believed that this was not the plan they had in mind since they are seriously considering to commence workouts for the NBA G-League. In their first game back together with his twin brother, Marcus dropped 11 points and 7 rebounds in a 86-62 victory over the McNeese State Cowboys. His twin brother, Michael, recorded 9 points and 4 steals in that same game. On January 29, 2022, Marcus scored a season-high 27 points to go along with 9 rebounds in a 69–61 victory over the Temple Owls.

Professional career

NorthPort Batang Pier (2023)
On November 2022, Weathers signed with the San Miguel Beermen of the Philippine Basketball Association (PBA) as the team's import for the 2023 PBA Governors' Cup. However, on January 11, 2023, San Miguel selected Cameron Clark as their import instead. Later that day, Weathers signed with the NorthPort Batang Pier, still with the PBA. After playing four games, he was replaced by Kevin Murphy.

Tainan TSG GhostHawks (2023–present)
On March 6, 2023, Weathers signed with Tainan TSG GhostHawks of the T1 League.

Career statistics

Collegiate

|-
| style="text-align:left;"| 2018–19
| style="text-align:left;"| Duquesne
| 31 || 30 || 26.7 || .489 || .245 || .641 || 6.4 || .8 || .6 || .8 || 10.0
|-
| style="text-align:left;"| 2019–20
| style="text-align:left;"| Duquesne
| 30 || 30 || 29.4 || .557 || .161 || .673 || 8.1 || 1.7 || 1.1 || 1.3 || 14.3
|-
| style="text-align:left;"| 2020–21
| style="text-align:left;"| Duquesne
| 18 || 18 || 29.6 || .481 || .310 || .637 || 7.5 || 1.5 || .9 || .7 || 15.3
|-
| style="text-align:left;"| 2021–22
| style="text-align:left;"| SMU
| 33 || 25 || 28.1 || .507 || .333 || .714 || 7.5 || 1.8 || .5 || .6 || 12.8

Personal life
Marcus Weathers was born to Michael Weathers and Joann Loring. He has a fraternal twin brother, Michael Jr., his father's namesake, who was born three minutes before him. The twin brothers were always comfortable when they are in reach of the other.  Weathers' father played college basketball for the Drake Bulldogs. Their father, Michael Sr., died from an enlarged heart when they were 5 years old. They have fond memories of him making them breakfast and taking them to the park.

References

1997 births
Living people
American expatriate basketball people in the Philippines
American men's basketball players
American twins
Basketball players from Kansas
Duquesne Dukes men's basketball players
Fraternal twins
Miami RedHawks men's basketball players
NorthPort Batang Pier players
People from Roeland Park, Kansas
Philippine Basketball Association imports
Small forwards
SMU Mustangs men's basketball players
Twin sportspeople
Tainan TSG GhostHawks players
T1 League imports